Valentin is a male given name meaning "strong, healthy, power, rule, terco". It comes from the Latin name Valentinus, as in Saint Valentin. Commonly found in Spain, Romania, Bulgaria, France, Italy, Russia, Ukraine, Scandinavia, Latin America etc. Valentin is also used as a surname in Spanish and German speaking-countries.

Given name

First name
 Valentin Abel (born 1991), German politician
 Valentin Alexandru (born 1991), Romanian footballer
 Valentin Blass (born 1995), German basketball player
 Valentin Bondarenko (1937–1961), Soviet fighter pilot 
 Valentin de Boulogne (before 1591 – 1632), French painter 
 Valentin Brunel (born 1996), French DJ known as Kungs
 Valentin "Val" Brunn (born 1994), German electronic music producer and DJ known as Virtual Riot 
 Valentin Bosioc (born 1983), Romanian bodybuilder
 Valentín Castellanos (born 1998), Argentine footballer
 Valentin Ceaușescu (born 1948), Romanian physicist
 Valentin Chmerkovskiy (born 1986), Ukrainian–American ballroom dancer
 Valentin Coșereanu (born 1991), Romanian footballer 
 Valentin Crețu (disambiguation), several people
 Valentín Díaz (1845–1916), Filipino patriot 
 Valentin Dikul (born 1948), Russian circus artist
 Valentin Dzhavelkov (born 1968), Bulgarian Olympic pentathlete
 Valentín Elizalde (1979–2006), Mexican singer
 Valentin Eysseric (born 1992), French footballer 
 Valentin Friedland (1490–1556), German scholar
 Valentin Gaft (1935–2020), Russian actor
 Valentin Gapontsev (1939–2021), Russian–American billionaire
 Valentin Gjokaj (born 1993), Albanian footballer
 Valentin Glushko (1908–1989), Soviet rocket engineer
 Valentin Grubeck (born 1995), Austrian footballer
 Valentin Haussmann (died c. 1611), German composer
 Hans-Valentin Hube, German general and commander during Zhitomir–Berdichev offensive
 Valentin Inzko (born 1949), Austrian diplomat
 Valentin Ivanov (disambiguation), several people
 Valentin-Yves Mudimbe (born 1941), Congolese philosopher, professor, and author
 Valentin Nikolayev (disambiguation), several people
 Valentin Olenik (1939–1987), Russian Olympic wrestler
 Valentin Parnakh (1891–1951), Russian jazz musician
 Valentin Plătăreanu (1936–2019), Romanian actor
 Valentin Poénaru (born 1932), Romanian–French mathematician
 Valentin Prades (born 1992), French Olympic pentathlete
 Valentin Rapp (born 1992), German squash player
 Valentin Roberge (born 1987), French footballer
 Valentin Rose (disambiguation), several people
 Valentin Rosier (born 1996), French footballer
 Valentin Sarov (born 1976), Bulgarian–Qatari weightlifter
 Valentin Serov (1865–1911), Russian painter
 Valentin Shashin (1916–1977), Soviet politician
 Valentin Stocker (born 1989), Swiss footballer 
 Valentin Teodosiu (born 1953), Romanian actor
 Valentin Trujillo (1951–2006), Mexican actor, writer and director
 Valentín Vada (born 1996), Argentine footballer
 Valentín Viola (born 1991), Argentine footballer
 Valentin Vodnik (1758–1819), Slovenian intellectual, linguist, poet, journalist and editor
 Valentin Yordanov (born 1960), Bulgarian Olympic wrestler

Middle name
 Charles-Valentin Alkan (1813–1888), French-Jewish composer and pianist
 Hans-Valentin Hube (1890–1944), German Wehrmacht general

Surname
 Dave Valentin (1952–2017), American Latin jazz flautist
Isabelle Valentin (born 1962), French politician
Karl Valentin (1882–1948), German comedian, author and film producer
Bobby Valentín (born 1941), "El Rey del Bajo" (King of the Bass)

See also

Valentinus (disambiguation)
Valentine (disambiguation)
Valentino (disambiguation)

French masculine given names
Romanian masculine given names
Russian masculine given names
Bulgarian masculine given names
Slovene masculine given names
Croatian masculine given names
Polish masculine given names
Czech masculine given names
Slovak masculine given names